The Mexico City trolleybus system serves Mexico City, the capital city of Mexico, and is operated by Servicio de Transportes Eléctricos.

The system opened on 9 March 1951.  As of mid-2014, the system had 8 lines and the operable fleet included around 360 trolleybuses. The total number of trolleybuses scheduled in service in peak periods was 290 in late 2012, but was 264 in mid-2014.  Until 2019, the lines were identified with the following letters: A, CP, D, G, I, K, LL and S.

As of 2018, the fare is MXN $4.00 (€ 0.18, or US$ 0.21). The nine lines currently in operation are designated by numbers.

Lines

Lines 1 to 7 are cross-city routes, of which 3, 4, and 7 are tangential routes, not reaching the city centre and generally oriented perpendicular to radial routes ("crosstown" route in American English). Line 9 is a short tangential route that is not "cross-city". Line 8 is a "feeder" route, feeding the city's metro system at Politécnico station and also line 1.

On October 29, 2022, line 10 was inaugurated from Metro Constitución de 1917 to Acahualtepec. From Acahualtepec to Metro Santa Marta is under construction.

See also

Servicio de Transportes Eléctricos, the public transport agency responsible for the operation of all trolleybus and light rail services in Mexico City – article currently has much more information on the history of the trolleybus system
List of trolleybus systems
Transport in Mexico City

References

External links

 

Transportation in Mexico City
Mexico City
Mexico City
1951 establishments in Mexico